Roland Zwahlen (born 17 May 1977) is a Swiss biathlete. He competed in the men's 20 km individual event at the 2002 Winter Olympics.

References

External links
 

1977 births
Living people
Swiss male biathletes
Olympic biathletes of Switzerland
Biathletes at the 2002 Winter Olympics
Sportspeople from Bern